The ICC Women's Cricket World Cup is the sport's oldest world championship, with the first tournament held in England in 1973. Matches are played as One Day Internationals (ODIs) over 50 overs per team, while there is also another championship for Twenty20 International cricket, the ICC Women's T20 World Cup.

The World Cup is currently organised by the International Cricket Council (ICC). Until 2005, when the two organisations merged, it was administered by a separate body, the International Women's Cricket Council (IWCC). The first World Cup was held in England in 1973, two years before the inaugural men's tournament. The event's early years were marked by funding difficulties, which meant several teams had to decline invitations to compete and caused gaps of up to six years between tournaments. However, since 2005 World Cups have been hosted at regular four-year intervals.

Qualification for the World Cup is through the ICC Women's Championship and the World Cup Qualifier. The composition of the tournament is extremely conservative – no new teams have debuted in the tournament since 1997, and since 2000 the number of teams in the World Cup has been fixed at eight. However, in March 2021, the ICC revealed that the tournament would expand to 10 teams from the 2029 edition. The 1997 edition was contested by a record eleven teams, the most in a single tournament to date.

The eleven World Cups played to date have been held in five countries, with India and England having hosted the event three times. Australia is the most successful team, having won seven titles and failed to make the final on only three occasions. England (four titles) and New Zealand (one title) are the only other teams to have won the event, while India (twice) and the West Indies (once) have each reached the final without going on to win.

History

First World Cup
Women's international cricket was first played in 1934, when a party from England toured Australia and New Zealand. The first Test match was played on 28–31 December 1934, and was won by England. The first Test against New Zealand followed early the following year. These three nations remained the only Test playing teams in women's cricket until 1960, when South Africa played a number of matches against England. Limited overs cricket was first played by first-class teams in England in 1962. Nine years later, the first international one day match was played in men's cricket, when England took on Australia at the Melbourne Cricket Ground.

Talks began in 1971 about holding a World Cup for women's cricket, led by Jack Hayward. South Africa, under pressure from the world for their apartheid laws, were not invited to take part in the competition. Both of the other two Test playing nations, Australia and New Zealand were invited. Hayward had previously organised tours of the West Indies by England women, and it was from this region that the other two competing nations were drawn; Jamaica and Trinidad & Tobago. To make up the numbers, England also fielded a "Young England" team, and an "International XI" was also included. Five South Africans were invited to play for the International XI as a means of compensation for the team not being invited, but these invitations were later withdrawn.

The inaugural tournament was held at a variety of venues across England in June and July 1973, two years before the first men's Cricket World Cup was played. The competition was played as a round-robin tournament, and the last scheduled match was England against Australia. Australia went into the game leading the table by a solitary point: they had won four matches and had one abandoned. England had also won four matches, but they had lost to New Zealand. As a result, the match also served as a de facto final for the competition. England won the match, held at Edgbaston, Birmingham by 92 runs to win the tournament.

Finals

Results
Fifteen teams have qualified for the Women's Cricket World Cup at least once (excluding qualification tournaments). Three teams have competed at every tournament, the same three sides who have won a title: England, Australia and New Zealand.

Teams' performances
Legend
 – Champions
 – Runners-up
 – Third place
 – Losing semi-finalist (no third-place playoff)
 – Losing quarter-finalist (no further playoffs)
 — Hosts

Debutant teams

†No longer have ODI status. ‡No longer exists.

Overview
The table below provides an overview of the performances of teams over past World Cups, as of the end of the 2022 tournament. Teams are sorted by best performance, then by appearances, total number of wins, total number of games, and alphabetical order respectively.

†No longer have ODI status. ‡No longer exists.

 The Win percentage excludes no results and counts ties as half a win.
 Teams are sorted by their best performance, then winning percentage, then (if equal) by alphabetical order.

Awards

Player of the Tournament

Player of the Final

Tournament records

See also

 ICC Women's Championship
 ICC Women's World Twenty20

References

Bibliography

External links

Women's World Cup match records from the International Cricket Council
Cricinfo Women
ICC Women's Cricket World Cup 2008–09
Winning Squads

 
Cricket World Cup
Recurring sporting events established in 1973
International Cricket Council events
Women's One Day International cricket competitions
World championships in cricket
World cups